Festivali i Këngës, also referred to as simply FiK, is an annual music competition in Albania organised by the national broadcaster Radio Televizioni Shqiptar (RTSH). Broadcast every year since its inauguration in 1962, it has also determined the country's representative for the Eurovision Song Contest since 2004.

Various singing presentations have been used throughout its history, beginning with radio-only interpretations in the first few years, live performances, playback, remakes, and even duets featuring other singers. The winners have traditionally been selected by a jury. However, other voting methods have also been applied, such as televoting or regional juries. At times, the head juror has carried twice the voting power of other jurors.

Vaçe Zela holds the record for most victories in the competition with eleven wins followed by Tonin Tërshana with four wins and Aurela Gaçe, Manjola Nallbani, and Elsa Lila with three wins. The most recent winner is Elsa Lila who won the 61st edition of the contest.

History 

The first edition of Festivali i Këngës took place on 21 December 1962 at the High Institute of Arts in Tirana and was won by Vaçe Zela performing the song titled "Fëmija i parë". The contest's entries was, under communism, strictly centered around light music. It developed over time, starting with neutrally themed entries to becoming a tool for the governing Communist Party of Albania in promoting its ideals.

The 1972 edition was a turning point for the contest, in which dictator Enver Hoxha prosecuted the organisers of Festivali i Këngës 11 after declaring them "enemies of the public". They were accused of endangering the country with "immoral aspects" in their songs and performances. Following this development, the ruling Communist Party imposed numerous sanctions on the contest's creativity, with a strict censorship on anything deemed inappropriate by the government. This ranged from limiting the type of clothes artists could wear, to restricting their range of movement while performing. The main organisers of the show were accused of conspiring against the country and corrupting its youth.

After the 1972 edition the contest dwelled in a period of extreme pressure and censorship. The songs were highly monitored and the topics were generally related to the country's development or the government and its main figures. This oppression continued until 1984 when the dictator died. The following year, the change in lyrics was very abrupt and censorship began to relax. Nertila Koka and Anita Bitri quickly became the favourite new singers of songs about love, while Parashqevi Simaku, Irma Libohova and Morena Reka also motivated the youth with progressively more liberal political entries year after year. Rock groups such as Tingulli i Zjarrtë had a considerable impact with the message of their songs and the introduction of rock music to the Albanian music scene, a genre which has endured successfully to this day and can easily be spotted even in modern FIK entries, a large part of which feature electric guitars. This was a planned liberalisation that had the silent consent of the Communist Party leadership all along, primarily as a result of their realisation that the days of Communism in Eastern Europe were coming to an end. The general public however was less aware of the imminence of such changes to the political order, making the performances have a puzzling effect that provoked both outrage and hope. Although Albania was the last country in Eastern Europe to part with communist rule in 1992, FIK entries were ringing the bells of change already by 1988.
 
With the fall of communism during the early 90s, Festivali i Këngës had a temporary boost in both quality and diversity. The winning songs reflected the transitional period that the country was undergoing. The 1991 winner, Ardit Gjebrea - "Jon", and the 1992 winner, Osman Mula's entry sung by Aleksandër Gjoka, Manjola Nallbani & Viktor Tahiraj titled "Pesha e fatit" (The weight of fate) had an immigration and freedom theme, which coincided with the state of affairs in Albania at the time. During this period, the contest was also introduced to the word God for the first time. Prior to that, religion was illegal and the word God was not allowed to be pronounced in public. The participation of Albanian singers from outside the country's borders was also an addition to the history of the festival during this decade. Before that, the country was in a period of isolation. The clothing and performances of the singers became more extravagant as time went by, with singers like Bleona Qereti, Ledina Çelo and Adelina Ismajli being among the most notable trendsetters of the new era.

In 1996, the stage of Festivali i Këngës welcomed newcomer Elsa Lila in a performance that deeply touched the hearts of the public with the clarity of her voice. She won the contest with "Pyes lotin" (I ask the tear) in 1996 and pulled off another victory the following year with "Larg urrejtjes" (Away from the hatred) in 1997. These songs mirrored the country's difficult reality following the collapse of the pyramid schemes, an event which wreaked havoc all throughout Albania. Despite the difficult times, Festivali i Këngës never stopped its broadcast and went ahead as scheduled during the final weeks of December, as it has done for every year since its inception.

In 1998, Albërie Hadërgjonaj became the first Kosovar-Albanian singer to win the contest with the ballad "Mirësia dhe e vërteta" (Goodness and truth). The song had a humanitarian anti-war message and is often referred to locally as a song for Kosovo, relating to the 1998–1999 war.

Up until 1999, Festivali i Këngës was the biggest music event in Albania. Its popularity began to waver after the introduction of other competitions such as Top Fest and Kënga Magjike, which were more liberal with their entry and singer selections, and eventually began to produce higher ratings. However, with Albania's introduction to the Eurovision Song Contest in 2004, Festivali i Këngës quickly began producing a greater degree of national and international interest. In addition, other competitors were lost to Top Fest, a festival which started a few years later as a reality series on Top Channel leading to a Spring finale. The festival received a boost of audience when another talented newcomer touched the stage of FIK in 2003, idol winner Anjeza Shahini. She had recently won the "Ethet e së Premtes Mbrëma" (Albanian Idol) talent show a few months prior to competing in FIK and the public was highly impressed with her voice and her charming stage presence.

Eurovision Song Contest 

Anjeza Shahini won the 42nd edition of Festivali i Këngës, placing hopeful professional singer Mariza Ikonomi in second place. Mariza boycotted the stage when the results were announced in a sign of disappointment. Much was at stake in this edition, as the winner would be the first ever representative of Albania in the Eurovision Song Contest. Anjeza went on to sing at the Eurovision Song Contest 2004, landing herself in a respectable 7th place with the song "The Image of You". Ever since, a more international interest around the festival has emerged, with Eurovision fans from Europe and beyond increasingly following the contest through live internet streams and satellite feeds. Every year, hashtags related to Festivali i Këngës have trended on Twitter in many European countries during the live final. Festivali i Këngës is usually the first national selection process of the Eurovision season, where countries reveal their competing entries for the main contest in May. Due to it commonly being held around Christmas week, Eurovision fans refer to this time period as "FIKmas".

Albania's Eurovision journey has produced many memorable entries and performances by both established and emerging musicians. Its best result to date has been by Kosovo-Albanian singer Rona Nishliu with the song "Suus", ranking 2nd in the semi-final and 5th in the final of the Eurovision Song Contest 2012.

Trivia 

 In the early editions of Festivali i Këngës, each song would be interpreted two or three times by different singers. However, only one of the versions sung would be declared the winner.
 In 1980, it has been rumoured that the government intervened in the selection of the winner, giving the victory to "Shoqet tona ilegale" (Our illegal friends) by Vaçe Zela instead of "Njerëzit e agimeve" (People of the mornings) by Alida Hisku. While the first is a song honouring undercover friendships among partisans during the time of the national liberation of Albania from Nazi forces, the latter makes strong references to intellectual awakening and enlightenment ideas, as evidenced by its lyrics: "The generations have long dreamed of an awakening like this, with the sun in their hearts, with the light in their eyes, among mornings of fire, new generations grow, they plant like the wheat, new days to come"; concepts deemed strongly in contrast with the philosophy of Enver Hoxha's dictatorship.
 In 1987, it was said that Kozma Dushi with the song "Lot me ty o djalë" (Hey boy we cry with you) was set to be declared the winner, however minutes before the jury made their decision, the wife of the country's ruler, Nexhmije Hoxha, declared that she did not want that song to win, so another song was chosen to win.
 In 1994, Mariza Ikonomi became the youngest singer to compete in the festival at the age of 12, in a duet with Françesk Radi and their song "Telefonatë zemrash" (Phone call of hearts).
 In 1995, the song "E Doni Dashurinë" (Do you want love) by Luan Zhegu & Ledina Çelo was reported to be the most applauded song in Festivali i Këngës history to date, a total applause time of 7 minutes and 11 seconds.
 In 1998 the first Kosovar-Albanian singer, Albërie Hadërgjonaj with the song "Mirësia dhe e vërteta" (Goodness and truth), was declared the winner.
 In 1999, the song "Apokalipsi" (The Apocalypse) by Irma & Eranda Libohova was initially declared the winner instead of Aurela Gaçe's  "S'jam tribu" (I'm not a tribute) due to a miscalculation in jury votes.
 In 2016, hologram technology was used to bring back a performance by Vaçe Zela as a tribute, almost three years after the iconic singer's death.

Controversies 
 In 1963, Besnik Taraveshi was the first singer to be prosecuted by the Communist Dictatorship, ahead of many to come throughout the history of the festival. This was due to his interpretation and mispronunciation of a word in the song "Djaloshi dhe shiu" (The boy and the rain).
 In 1964, head of the jury Llazar Siliqi decided that no first place will be awarded, due to the low quality of the songs. Instead, "Dritaren kërkoj" by Vaçe Zela was awarded second place, and two other songs awarded third place.
 In 1972, Enver Hoxha deemed the organisers of Festivali i Këngës 11 "Enemies of The People", a name given to all the subjects who he considered a danger to the country. Unluckily, many of them were prosecuted after being accused of endangering the country's mentality by introducing an immoral aspect to the show, and plotting against the government by influencing the Albanian youth at the time. RTSH general director at the time Todi Lubonja, together with the festival's director Mihal Luarasi and singer Sherif Merdani were sentenced and would remain imprisoned for sixteen years until 1989, while many of the others involved were banned from working in television and/or were deported to remote Albanian cities. The claims were out of context and these punishments were used as an example and a statement for future organisers. There is a whole book dedicated to this event: Festivali i Njëmbëdhjetë (The 11th Festival), written by Skifter Këlliçi.
 In 1997, Alma Bektashi had a wardrobe malfunction on stage when her dress fell off, revealing her breast. The cameras managed to avoid the incident, however the audience received a full view of the incident.
 In 1999, Irma & Eranda Libohova left the Palace of Congresses early, thinking that their song "Apokalipsi" (The Apocalypse) would not win. The song was initially declared as the winner, although a miscalculation in the jury votes announced the following day by head juror Vaçe Zela, revealed that Aurela Gaçe's "S'jam tribu" (I'm not a tribute) had won instead.
 In 2003, singer Mariza Ikonomi, who was eager to represent Albania for the first time in the Eurovision Song Contest, left the venue in sign of protest when it was announced that her entry "Mbi urë" (Over a bridge) had ranked 2nd, losing to Anjeza Shahini's "Imazhi Yt".
 In 2004, the producers of the song "Nesër shkoj" filed a lawsuit against Ledina Çelo because she had signed contracts with a phone company without previously consulting them. She was also accused of not attending the conferences set up the producers and that she had not rehearsed the song enough. The suit was dropped within the week that it was filed.
 In 2006, Greta Koçi was so disappointed from her 5th placing with the song "Eja zemër" that she burst out in tears, while her mother faced off the festival's 7 member jury with allegations of corruption and incompetence.
 In 2007, Blero dropped out of the competition, claiming that he was asked for a large amount of money in exchange of a victory by an anonymous caller. He also claimed that the first three positions were already decided by the organisers prior to the event. The jury and the festival administration replied in a press statement that it was Blero who had asked for the first prize by sending an SMS which stated that he would withdraw if his victory was not guaranteed.
 Also in 2007, Manjola Nallbani accused the festival authorities that they had sabotaged her song. Her voice was not heard at all in the hall, instead the public only heard the orchestra and the playback. This was confirmed by the general director of the festival Zamira Koleci. Nallbani declared that she would no longer participate in this event and called certain organisers mafiosos.
 The 2007 edition also provoked a huge public reaction and massive press attention after the song "Jeta kërkon dashuri" (Life needs love) by Flaka Krelani and Doruntina Disha placed second, prompting corruption accusations about the jury, namely Gjergj Xhuvani and Alban Skënderaj. These two judges did not give any points to this song, while four judges awarded it maximum points and Rudina Magjistari awarded it the second highest points. General Director Zamira Koleci in a press interview called the two judges "gangsters and racists" after their boycott of the song from the Kosovo Albanian singers. Edmond Zhulali, composer of the song and artistic director of FIK, submitted a request to the RTSH council for the jury's votes to be disqualified. The council however turned down this request after 2 hours of debate.
 In 2013, an alleged change in the contractual agreement between the festival and Kosovo model Diellza Kolgeci, the previously assigned female host for FIK 52, led to Diellza withdrawing from her hosting duties just days before the live show. She stated that the original terms of her contract included the costs of lodging and other amenities for her personal assistant, however the modified version did not include such expenses, citing a suspicious lack of funds in the festival's budget following a change of directors. The festival responded to the controversy by airing a satirical ad featuring male host Enkel Demi appearing upset at the news of Diellza's withdrawal, and three replacement female hosts, model Marinela Meta, Miss Albania 2011 Xhesika Berberi, and actress Klea Huta. The girls cheer him up by saying that they would be more than willing to co-host the show with him and that they can't wait for the rehearsals to begin. In response, Diellza utilized some prominent newspapers in Albania to state that it would be impossible to replace her, as well as to clarify that she would not be willing to compromise her values over one show. She said that if enough notice had been given to her about the changes in the contract, she could easily book 10,000 hotel rooms for her assistant through her large base of connections. She expressed respect for the festival's history however, despite her disagreements with the current staff. Meanwhile, Enkel appeared to have a humorous take on Diellza's high standards, saying that his diet had been affected by her presence, referring to her demands for lean meats covered in lemon juice.
 In 2014, the contest's organizers ran into some high-profile problems when it came to successfully booking their guest singer for their interval act. After Conchita Wurst's refusal earlier in December due to a busy schedule, Alexander Rybak, who initially accepted FIK's offer to perform, also pulled out at the last minute after his composed entry in the Belarusian national final failed to secure a victory. He stated that the combination of this disappointment, along with some misunderstandings with FIK's authorities, forced him to make this unusual cancellation. Reaction by fans was mixed, as some decried unprofessionalism, while others appeared more empathetic. FIK organizers ultimately relied on jury members Genc Dashi and Rona Nishliu to fill in for Rybak, as Dashi improvised on the guitar, while Nishliu paid tribute to Vaçe Zela, who had died earlier in February. It was also rumored that the opening act of the grand final, consisting of a well-liked violin reprise of past FIK entries, was the organisers' ironic response to Rybak's last-minute cancellation.
 In 2015, Edea Demaliaj's song "Era" (The wind), composed by Adrian Hila and written by Pandi Laço, was disqualified by the festival's directors, despite being included in the initial list of competing entries. Hila expressed his discontent when interviewed on the TV show Oktapod, contesting the board's decision to disqualify his song simply because its lyrics were written by the host of FIK 54 Pandi Laço. Meanwhile, singer Edea Demaliaj dropped out of the competition after finding herself without a song. Her replacement was Orgesa Zaimi, whose entry had not qualified during the internal pre-selection stage.
 Also in 2015, Eneda Tarifa's victory reignited allegations of bias and corruption by the jury and the festival's organizers, as media and critics attributed Tarifa's win to her close friendship and joint business venture with FIK's current artistic director Elton Deda, rather than on her merit versus the competition. The jury's integrity had previously been questioned when 22 entries, rather than the planned 18, were qualified for the grand final, raising suspicions that certain singers had passed on to the final based on name recognition rather than song quality. Adding more to the scrutiny was the fact that, instead of revealing the full set of votes from every juror, the festival regressed to its old practice of mentioning only the top ranked songs in the final, circumventing any individual responsibility for potentially compromised jurors in the process. The controversial victory of Eneda Tarifa brought to the forefront an old spat that the singer had once had with Albanian LGBT rights defender Kristi Pinderi, when he had publicly challenged Tarifa's moral standards after she had lashed out against Conchita Wurst's triumph in Eurovision 2014. At the time, Tarifa had initially complained that music itself had been eclipsed by Conchita's win, but in a subsequent statement she elaborated that the Eurovision Song Contest was not spreading the correct set of values to its European audience, and that certain LGBT groups were lobbying for attention and exposure in this contest. Her fragmented reaction, along with her concerns on how to explain “Conchita” to her family, were dismissed by Pinderi as embellished homophobia on her part. In a heated media exchange, he challenged Tarifa's intellect along with her diploma in Social Works, while recalling an old interview as a journalist for his previous employer where he was left with the impression that “she was either not very smart, or she did not know how to properly articulate smart things”.
 In 2016, there was controversy over the festival's decision not to follow through with the announced 60% jury and 40% public voting ratio during the final. Instead, the public vote counted only for 1/13th of the final result. Under a 60/40 split, Lindita would have tied with Ylli Limani at 120 points, requiring tie-breaking procedures to determine the winner. It is worth noting that Lindita received votes from 11 jurors compared to Limani's 7, and received top scores from 5 jurors compared to Limani's 1. In addition, Lindita won the jury vote by scoring twice as much as Limani (80 points v. 40 points), while Limani won the public vote by scoring twice as much as Lindita (10 points v. 5 points). A 60/40 ratio would have required that the public vote be worth 8 times the vote of 1 member from the 12-member jury.
 Also in 2016, Ledina Çelo's see-through dress on the first semi final made waves throughout the Albanian media as criticism ensued due to the family-oriented nature of the festival's audience. Her hosting abilities were also heavily criticised. Journalist Dasara Karaiskaj, known for her pointed humor, lamented the situation by commenting that Çelo must have read the script "through her ass".
 In 2017, singer Kastro Zizo claimed that his song was politically censored by RTSH due to its lyrics. RTSH stated that the decision was made by the preselection jury, which could qualify only 22 out of the 70 entries that were submitted, leaving no space for politics to play a role. After posting the lyrics in full, Kastro maintained that the lyrics were penalized for portraying the increase in migration that has come as a result of the policies of the current government, blaming RTSH bureaucrats for the occurrence. Former prime minister Sali Berisha also expressed his views, comparing the jury's decision to Hoxha's censorship over the festival during the 1970s. A few days later, singer Klajdi Musabelliu made a similar complaint, stating that he was shocked to learn that his migration-themed entry did not pass preselection. Since Musabelliu also works for an opposition party, his disqualification from the FIK semi finals quickly became politicised as well.

Presenters

Winners 
A complete list of the winning entries performed at Festivali i Këngës since its inauguration in 1962.

Recurring winners
As of 2022, Vaçe Zela holds the record for the highest number of wins having won the contest eleven times followed by Tonin Tërshana with four wins, Aurela Gaçe and Manjola Nallbani with three wins respectively.

Notes

References

External links

  

 
Eurovision Song Contest selection events
Singing competitions
December events
1962 establishments in Albania
Contemporary music festivals in Albania
Music festivals established in 1962
Events in Tirana
1962 Albanian television series debuts
21st-century Albanian television series